Schoberer Rad Meßtechnik (SRM), or Schoberer Rad Messtechnik, is a company which created the first cycling power meter. Formed in 1986 by Ulrich Schoberer, the firm's name literally means "Schoberer’s bike measurement technology." The SRM Powermeter uses built-in strain gauges to determine the power, in Watts, that the cyclist outputs to the bicycle cranks and chainring.

References

External links
Official website

Companies established in 1986
Cycle parts manufacturers